Voyages of Discovery may refer to:
Exploration
 The Age of Discovery, the period in history
 Exploration (video game), a simulation strategy game designed by Software 2000 in 1994
 Voyages of Discovery (cruise line) a cruise line